HEC Alumni is a nonprofit organization created in 1883, alumni association of the French business school École des Hautes Etudes Commerciales (HEC Paris).

History 
The alumni association has been founded on June 20, 1883, 2 years after the establishment of the school in 1881. At the beginning, it has the name of Association des Anciens Elèves de l'École des Hautes Études Commerciales. It is governed by the law of July 1, 1901 and the decree of August 16, 1901.

On January 11, 1900, it was recognized as being of public utility.

The association is member of the Conférence des Grandes écoles.

Purpose 

Its objectives, defined by its statutes, are to:

 create and maintain friendly relations between graduates of HEC Paris entities;
 come to the aid of Members who need assistance;
 disseminate to the public technical knowledge relating to the economy, management and business;
 contribute to the development of the presence and influence of French companies abroad and in international trade;
 implement all means to maintain the value and increase the notoriety, in France and abroad, of the entities of HEC Paris and the degrees the school delivers.

Publications 
The association publishes a monthly magazine entitled « HEC stories ».

It also publishes an alumni annual directory.

Memberships 
The association is in partnership with WATs4U (World Alumni Talents for you) alongside other major grandes écoles such as École Polytechnique, CentraleSupélec, etc.

Presidents 
:fr:Emmanuel Chain was President of the association from 2015 to 2018.

Organization 
The Board of Directors is made up of 24 members in 2022, including 22 elected graduates, a representative of the School, and a representative of the HEC Foundation.

References

External links 
 Official website

Alumni associations
Organizations based in Paris
HEC Paris alumni
1883 establishments in France